Lah may refer to:

Lah (surname)
 Lithium aluminium hydride
 Lah, Victoria, Australia
 Lah, Kona, a village in Kona Department, Mouhoun Province, Burkina Faso
 Lah, Yaba, a village in Nayala Province, Burkina Faso
 A Singlish/Manglish term used for emphasis or reassurance